"So Doggone Lonesome" is a song written and recorded by American country music singer Johnny Cash. He and his band (The Tennessee Two) recorded the song in a studio session at Sun Records studios at 706 Union Avenue in Memphis, Tennessee. The session took place on July 30, 1955, when the trio also recorded "Luther Played The Boogie" (a homage to the group's lead guitarist, Luther Perkins) and "Mean Eyed Cat", the latter of which Cash reprised on his Unchained album for Rick Rubin's American Recordings.

Cash was a great admirer of Ernest Tubb, and wrote "So Doggone Lonesome" with him in mind. Many of Cash's self-penned recordings were written with a certain artist in mind, including "Get Rhythm", originally written for Elvis Presley. 

Legend has it that Tubb heard "So Doggone Lonesome" on the radio, which inspired him to record his own version of the song. Tubb did indeed record "So Doggone Lonesome" and performed it on the Grand Ole Opry, but the inspiration for his decision to do so is unclear. Additionally, Cash is reported to have said he only believed he had truly "made it" as an artist when he heard Tubb singing one of his songs.

Chart performance

References

1955 singles
1955 songs
Rock-and-roll songs
Rockabilly songs
Johnny Cash songs
Songs written by Johnny Cash
Song recordings produced by Sam Phillips
Sun Records singles